The Foundation for Democratic Reforms is a non-profit, non-partisan and independent  research institution founded by Dr. Jayaprakash Narayan, an Indian Administrative Service officer turned politician and a political activist based in Hyderabad. It is one of India's leading think tanks and scientific research-resource center for studying, formulating and promoting fundamental reforms in political, electoral and governance spheres and in critical areas of state policy. Established in 1996 and located in Hyderabad, it is recognized by the Department of Scientific & Industrial Research (DSIR), Ministry of Science & Technology, Govt. of India.

Objective  
The aim of the foundation is to enable every Indian citizen to fully realize and enjoy:
Liberty and basic freedoms
Genuine democracy
Self-governance
Self-correcting institutions
Rule of law

Focus areas 
 Political and electoral reforms
 Good governance
 Empowerment of local governments
 Judicial reforms
 Key areas of state policy such as education, healthcare, agriculture, and cooperatives

Areas of work 
Surajya Movement: a movement to awaken people about good governance

Indian Democracy at Work: a forum to deliberate on critical levers of change that need to be pushed to make democracy deliver better results conducted first Conference on Money Power in Politics

See also 
 Youth Parliament Program
 Democracy in India
 Election Commission of India
 List of think tanks in India

References

External links 

 Foundation for Democratic Reforms website
 Lok Satta Party website
 Youth For Better India website
 Youth Parliament Program website

Non-profit organisations based in India
Think tanks based in India
1996 establishments in Andhra Pradesh
Think tanks established in 1996
Foundations based in India